Gopalpur Zoo is situated in Gopalpur village, Kangra district, Himachal Pradesh in India, en route the Dharmshala – Palampur road.  It is surrounded by Dhauladhar Range of the Himalayas. The zoo is adorned with maple trees, horse chestnut trees, chil and greenery  .
The major attractions of the zoo are: Asiatic lion,    leopard, Himalayan black bear, sambar deer, barking deer, goral, wild pigs, Bhutan Grey Peacocks, Cheer Pheasant, Red Jungle Fowl peacocks, vultures, eagles, etc.

See also

Zoos and Aviaries of Himachal Pradesh
There are three recognized zoological parks at Gopalpur, Renuka and Kufri and three aviaries at Shimla, Sarahan and Chail.

National Parks in Himachal Pradesh
 Great Himalayan National Park, Kullu District:  Area 765 km2 
 Pin Valley National Park, Lahaul and Spiti district: Area 675 km2

References

External links
 Himacahal Pradesh Tourism Development Corporation 
 Ecotourism Society of Himachal Pradesh 
 Himachal Pradesh Forest Department

Zoos in India
Buildings and structures in Kangra district
Tourist attractions in Himachal Pradesh
Year of establishment missing